

261001–261100 

|-bgcolor=#f2f2f2
| colspan=4 align=center | 
|}

261101–261200 

|-id=107
| 261107 Cameroncasimir ||  || Cameron Casimir Sage Becker (born 2017) is the son of the discoverer, and twin brother of Oban Helian Duane Becker. || 
|-id=108
| 261108 Obanhelian ||  || Oban Helian Duane Becker (born 2017) is the son of the discoverer, and twin brother of Cameron Casimir Sage Becker. || 
|-id=109
| 261109 Annie ||  || Annie Lakey Becker (born 1980), an American microbiologist and wife of the discoverer Andrew C. Becker || 
|-id=110
| 261110 Neoma ||  || Neoma Tennyson Skye Becker (born 2015) is the daughter of the discoverer. || 
|}

261201–261300 

|-id=291
| 261291 Fucecchio ||  || Fucecchio, a historic Italian town located between Pisa and Florence || 
|}

261301–261400 

|-bgcolor=#f2f2f2
| colspan=4 align=center | 
|}

261401–261500 

|-bgcolor=#f2f2f2
| colspan=4 align=center | 
|}

261501–261600 

|-bgcolor=#f2f2f2
| colspan=4 align=center | 
|}

261601–261700 

|-id=690
| 261690 Jodorowsky ||  || Alejandro Jodorowsky (born 1929), a Chilean-French film-maker, playwright, actor, author, musician and comics writer. || 
|}

261701–261800 

|-bgcolor=#f2f2f2
| colspan=4 align=center | 
|}

261801–261900 

|-bgcolor=#f2f2f2
| colspan=4 align=center | 
|}

261901–262000 

|-id=930
| 261930 Moorhead ||  || James Marshall Moorhead (born 1940), an American-Canadian astronomer || 
|-id=936
| 261936 Liulin ||  || Liu Lin (born 1936), a professor at China's Nanjing University || 
|}

References 

261001-262000